Colombia participated at the 2017 Summer Universiade, in Taipei, Taiwan with 81 competitors in 11 sports.

Competitors
The following table lists Colombia's delegation per sport and gender.

Medal summary

Athletics

Track Events

Field Events

Football

Women's tournament

Group Stage

9th-12th place semifinals

11th place match

Golf

Judo

Roller Sports

Men

Women

Swimming

Men

Women

Table Tennis

Taekwondo

Tennis

Volleyball

Women's tournament
Group Stage

|}

|}

9th-16th place quarterfinals

|}

13th-16th place semifinals

|}

15th place match

|}

Weightlifting

References

Nations at the 2017 Summer Universiade